Severin Buchta (born 14 February 1997) is a German footballer of Polish descent who plays as a midfielder.

Career
On 22 May 2019 it was announced, that Buchta would join Türkgücü München for the 2019–20 season on a one-year contract. However, after playing only two games - one minute in the Regionalliga and 90 minutes in a cup game - the club announced on 19 August 2019, that he had left on mutual agreement.

References

External links
 
 

1997 births
Living people
German footballers
German people of Polish descent
Association football midfielders
Karlsruher SC II players
Karlsruher SC players
Alemannia Aachen players
TSV 1860 Munich II players
2. Bundesliga players
Regionalliga players